Elizabeth Jenkins may refer to:

 Elizabeth Jenkins (author) (1905–2010), British novelist
 Elizabeth Jenkins (judge) (born 1950), United States federal magistrate judge

See also
Jenkins (name)